Shane Michael Hall (born August 25, 1969) is an American former professional stock car racing driver. He is a former driver in the NASCAR Xfinity Series. He last drove the No. 49 Chevrolet for Jay Robinson Racing. Hall is featured as an unlockable driver in the 2002 video game NASCAR Thunder 2003, and the 2001 game NASCAR Thunder 2002.

Racing career

Nextel Cup Series
Hall has one career Cup Series Start. Driving the No. 40 Kendall Oil Pontiac for Dick Brooks at the fall Rockingham race in 1995, he started last. With a crash about two-thirds through the race, Hall backed the No. 40 into the wall, and finished 36th.

Busch Series
Hall made his Busch debut in 1995 driving for Stegell Motorsports. Driving the No. 85 Lube America Chevy, Hall qualified 38th at Nashville Speedway USA and finished 26th, nine laps down. He made another start that year in Rockingham, finishing 22nd.

The Stegall team decided to run part-time in 1996, competing in 14 of the 26 races. His best run was once again at Rockingham, where he had a 12th-place finish and garnered his first career lead-lap finish. Hall gained his first-career top-ten start when he qualified 9th at Bristol, matching it two races later Nazareth.

Hall and Stegall ran full-time 1997. Despite not making two races, Hall earned his first career top-ten with a tenth-place finish at Watkins Glen International, while also winning his first career pole at South Boston.

In 1998, Hall scored three top-tens and a pole at Gateway.

For 1999, Hall switched over to the No. 43 team Owned by Mike Curb, but struggled severely, as he did not qualify for 6 of the 31 races. Despite that, Hall scored his first-career top-five at Myrtle Beach with a fourth-place effort. Yet once again, Hall struggled with 9 DNFs. He was released at the end of the year.

Hall only made two starts in 2000, running for the newly formed No. 0 Alumni Motorsports Chevy, with Ohio State University as the sponsor. With no owners' points, he struggled to qualify for many races, and was released.

Hall rebounded in 2001, signing with the No. 63 Hensley Racing Ford, sponsored by Lance Snacks. Hall continued to struggle and managed only 3 top 20 finishes, the best of which was 12th at Daytona International Speedway.

After Ken Alexander bought the No. 63 team in 2002, Hall continued to drive the car, competing in 24 races. He managed a tenth-place finish at Kentucky and had 5 other top-20s. Hall was released from the ride at the end of the year.

Hall made five races in 2003, four of which were for Jay Robinson Racing, though with three different numbers. He drove the No. 39 at Nashville, with a 39th-place finish, and the No. 89 at Nazareth, finishing last. Next, driving the No. 49, Hall finished 39th at the June Nashville Race and 28th at Kentucky. In addition, he drove the No. 15 PPC Racing Ford at Memphis, finishing 31st.

Hall made nine more starts in 2004. He ran at Gateway with Moy Racing in the No. 77 BG Products Ford, finishing 31st. He ran two more races for JRR in the No. 28 Team, finishing 41st at IRP and 38th at Dover. The other races were for ORTEC Racing, finishing 19th at Daytona and 20th at Pikes Peak.

He ran seven races with JRR in the No. 28 car in 2005, with a best finish of 33rd at Dover. However, he failed to finish any races, and was released. In 2006, he ran part-time with JRR's No. 28, contesting nine races, while failing to qualify for seven. After taking a year off in 2007, Hall returned to the then-renamed Nationwide Series in 2008 for 1 race at Nashville, driving the No. 49 for JRR.

Motorsports career results

NASCAR
(key) (Bold – Pole position awarded by qualifying time. Italics – Pole position earned by points standings or practice time. * – Most laps led.)

Winston Cup Series

Nationwide Series

References

External links
 

Living people
1969 births
Sportspeople from Greenville, South Carolina
Racing drivers from South Carolina
NASCAR drivers
CARS Tour drivers
American Speed Association drivers
People from Simpsonville, South Carolina